Peter John "P. J." Prinsloo (born 6 February 1978) is a South African actor. He has had recurring roles on Edgemont as Chris Laidlaw and on Battlestar Galactica as Lt. Mei 'Freaker' Firelli.

Prinsloo has been a social justice youth facilitator since 1999. He began by teaching anti-violence and anti-racism workshops for the Attorney General of Canada, touring schools throughout British Columbia. Prinsloo has also run an improv theatre tournament since 1998.

Personal life
P. J. Prinsloo is married to Rukiya Bernard, they have two children.

Filmography

Television

 The X Files (1995) ... Tagger
 Breaker High (1997) ... Boarder
 Edgemont (2000-2005) ... Chris Laidlaw
 Smallville (2003, 2010) ... Punk, Ron Troupe
 The 4400 (2005) ... Teddy
 - "Voices Carry" (2005) ... Teddy
 Stargate: Atlantis (2006)
 - "No Man's Land" (2006) ... Anders
 Battlestar Galactica (2005-2006)
 - "Pegasus" (2005) ... Lt. Mei 'Freaker' Firelli
 - "Exodus" (2006) ... Lt. Mei 'Freaker' Firelli
 - "Resurrection Ship" (2006) ... Lt. Mei 'Freaker' Firelli

Film
 Disturbing Behavior (1998) ... Robby Stewart
 Black Rain (2009) ... Andrew

References

External links

1978 births
Living people
Male actors from Cape Town
Afrikaner people
South African male film actors
South African male television actors